Bill A. Pearson (May 19, 1920 – November 28, 2002) was an American jockey in thoroughbred horse racing, a quiz-show winner, bit-part film actor, and an art dealer.

A native of Chicago, Illinois, Pearson was successful jockey throughout the 1940s and 1950s, credited with over 800 victories, Pearson developed his interest in art after a serious riding accident, and went on to win over $170,000 on the television quiz shows The $64,000 Question and The $64,000 Challenge in 1956-57.

The $64,000 Question had a series of contestants with what were considered to be unusual interests and a jockey who was also an art expert was of great public interest.  He acquired celebrity status as a result.

On November 15, 1958, Pearson appeared as a jockey in an episode of Perry Mason called "The Case of the Jilted Jockey", and had several small film parts in the next 20 years. In 1958, he was cast as private eye Donald Lam in a pilot episode of Cool and Lam, based on the books by Erle Stanley Gardner writing as A. A. Fair, but the pilot remains the only episode in existence.

He assembled an extensive art collection and in later life became a dealer in pre-Columbian art.

Writer Sam Shepard dedicated his 1983 play Fool for Love to Pearson. Pearson was married six times, and was living in Kingston, New York at the time of his death in 2002.

See also 
 List of horse accidents

References 

Pearson, Billy and Stephen Longstreet (2003). NEVER LOOK BACK, The Autobiography of a Jockey,  Simon and Schuster.

External links

The Case of the Jilted Jockey
Vanity Fair article, "The Jockey and the Showman"
Pearson on You Bet Your Life January 26, 1956

1920 births
2002 deaths
American jockeys
American male actors
Contestants on American game shows
American art dealers
Sportspeople from Chicago